"Turn Up the Love" is a song by American group Far East Movement from their fourth studio album Dirty Bass. It features vocals from Barbadian group Cover Drive. The song was released on June 21, 2012, as the album's third single. The song was written by Far East Movement, Andreas Schuller, Ricky Reed, Matthew Koma, and produced by Axident and Wallpaper (Ricky Reed).

The song is featured in the game Just Dance 2014. It was also one of the select songs available on the demo version.

Music video
A music video to accompany the release of "Turn Up the Love" was first released onto YouTube on June 21, 2012 at a total length of three minutes and thirty-five seconds. Singer Colette Carr makes a cameo.

There is an alternate music video named "Turn Up The Love (Do Something)" released onto YouTube on September 11, 2012 at a total length of three minutes and forty-one seconds.

Track listing

Other Versions
 7th Heaven Club Mix - 6:33

Credits and personnel
Lead vocals – Far East Movement and Amanda Reifer of Cover Drive
Producers – Axident and Wallpaper.
Writers – A. Schuller, R. Reed, J. Choung, J. Roh, K. Nishimura, V. Coquia, M. Baier
Label: Cherrytree Records / Interscope Records

Chart performance

Weekly charts

Year-end charts

Certifications

Release history

References

2012 singles
2012 songs
Far East Movement songs
Cover Drive songs
Cherrytree Records singles
Interscope Records singles
Songs written by Axident
Songs written by Ricky Reed
Songs written by Matthew Koma